The Mount Pleasant Correctional Facility (MPCF) is an Iowa Department of Corrections correctional institution located in Mount Pleasant, Iowa, United States.  As of 30 July 2010, the institution has 1100 inmates and another 44 in segregation in a 775-inmate facility.  The facility has about 340 staff members.

The MPCF primarily houses inmates with treatable personality disorders and substance abuse problems.  The facility specializes in treating sex offenders and those having substance abuse problems.  The facility also works to help inmates transition to life on the outside.
The correctional facility is located on the same campus as the Mount Pleasant Mental Health Institute.

See also

 List of Iowa state prisons

References  

Buildings and structures in Henry County, Iowa
Prisons in Iowa